Robustness is the property of being strong and healthy in constitution. When it is transposed into a system, it refers to the ability of tolerating perturbations that might affect the system’s functional body. In the same line robustness can be defined as "the ability of a system to resist change without adapting its initial stable configuration". 
"Robustness in the small" refers to situations wherein perturbations are small in magnitude, which considers that the "small" magnitude hypothesis can be difficult to verify because "small" or "large" depends on the specific problem. Conversely, "Robustness in the large problem" refers to situations wherein no assumptions can be made about the magnitude of perturbations, which can either be small or large.
It has been discussed that robustness has two dimensions: resistance and avoidance.

See also

 Fault-tolerant system and links thereof
 Resilience (disambiguation)
 Robustness principle

References

Personality traits
Systems